The 33rd Golden Horse Awards (Mandarin:第33屆金馬獎) took place on December 14, 1996 at Kaohsiung Cultural Center in Kaohsiung, Taiwan.

References

33rd
1996 film awards
1996 in Taiwan